Chebrolu is a village in Gollaprolu Mandal  in Kakinada district of Andhra Pradesh, India.

References

Villages in Gollaprolu mandal